On February 25, 2014, fifty-nine boys were killed at the Federal Government College of Buni Yadi in Yobe State, Nigeria. The twenty-four buildings of the school were also burned down as a result of the attack. No group has claimed responsibility for the attack, but according to media and local officials the Islamist militants Boko Haram are suspected to be behind the attack.

Background

The Federal Government College is a boarding school located in Buni Yadi, a town in Yobe State, Nigeria.  The co-educational, secondary school had twenty-four buildings at the time of the attack.

Islamic militants have been in conflict with the government in Northern Nigeria since 2009. Militant groups have increasingly focused on targeting civilians since May 2013 when President Goodluck Jonathan authorized the military to eliminate the resistance.  The violence has brought increased instability to Nigeria, the top petroleum producer in Africa. In February 2014, militants were responsible for 300 deaths, mostly of civilians. In late February, the government shut the Nigeria–Cameroon border in an attempt to keep militants from launching attacks in Nigeria and then fleeing into Cameroon.

The militant group Boko Haram, whose name means "Western education is sinful", has targeted schools for violent attacks on a number of occasions.  The group has been officially labeled as a terrorist organization in Nigeria and the United States, and large rewards have been offered for information leading to the capture of the group's leadership. In total, more than 1,000 deaths have been attributed to Boko Haram since May 2013.  The group has burnt more than 200 schools, according to official figures.  Abubakar Shekau, suspected leader of Boko Haram, issued a video statement in mid-February 2014 promising to continue the group's campaign against western values and threatening to broaden the scope of attacks.

A week before the attack, Boko Haram members killed 60 people in the town of Bama in neighboring Borno State; four days before that attack, the militants killed 106 in a mostly Christian village, Izghe; and three weeks before that the Islamists killed 78 in two attacks in the region.

Attack
On February 25, 2014, militants barged into the Federal Government College while the students were sleeping.  They threw explosives into dorm rooms as they sprayed the rooms with gunfire.  According to an eye-witness "students were trying to climb out of the windows and they were slaughtered like sheep by the terrorists who slit their throats. Others who ran were gunned down."  All twenty-four buildings were burnt to the ground during the attack.

Fifty-nine boys were killed in the attack. Some died from gunshots or knife wounds, while others were burned to death.  Survivors and victims' bodies were taken to Sani Abacha Specialist Hospital in the state capital of Damaturu.  A hospital spokesperson said it appeared that the militants had intentionally "spared" female students.

According to media reports, the attack "bore the hallmarks" of Boko Haram.  Local officials also attributed the attack to the group, but no claim of responsibility was made.

Aftermath
President Goodluck Jonathan called the Federal Government College attack "callous and senseless murder ... by deranged terrorists and fanatics who have clearly lost all human morality and descended to bestiality".  He vowed to "permanently eradicate the scourge of terrorism".  UN Secretary-General Ban Ki-moon condemned the attack saying "no objective can justify such violence" and said he was "deeply concerned about the increasing frequency and brutality of attacks".

Relatives of the attack victims surrounded the morgue angrily demanding answers.  The military had to take control of the building to restore order.  The government's failure to prevent the Federal Government College attack and similar incidents has led to public anger in northeast Nigeria.  Students across the region refused to sleep in their boarding schools after the attack and returned to their family homes.

Cause
According to the Yobe State Government, soldiers guarding a checkpoint near the attack site had withdrawn from their post hours before the attack.  State governor Ibrahim Gaidam blamed the withdrawal for the attack and said the national military had failed to protect the students.  A national military spokesperson, however, said the checkpoint had been dismantled earlier as part of a Joint Task Force operation.  He said bad phone lines, possibly cut by the attackers, had prevented the military from hearing about the attack in time to respond. Boko Haram, declared a terrorist organisation by Nigeria and the United States, is suspected to have started the attack as part of its fight "to create an Islamic state" in Nigeria's mainly Muslim north.

See also

Yobe State school shooting
 Timeline of Boko Haram insurgency

References

2014 murders in Nigeria
Massacres perpetrated by Boko Haram
Terrorist incidents in Nigeria in 2014
Yobe State
Massacres in 2014
University and college shootings
School bombings
Attacks on schools in Africa
Massacres of men
School massacres
Deaths by firearm in Nigeria
Mass shootings in Nigeria
Deaths by stabbing in Nigeria
Violence against men in Africa
February 2014 events in Nigeria
Attacks on schools in Nigeria
2014 mass shootings in Africa
2010s massacres in Nigeria